Virginia Vallejo García (born 26 August 1949) is a Colombian author, journalist, television director, anchorwoman, media personality, socialite, and political asylee in the United States of America.

On 18 July 2006, the DEA took her out of Colombia in a special flight to save her life and cooperate with the Department of Justice in high-profile cases, after she had publicly signaled several Colombian presidents and politicians of being beneficiaries or accomplices of the leading cocaine cartels.

In 2007, she published her first book, Loving Pablo, Hating Escobar, which led the Colombian justice system to reopen the cases of the Palace of Justice siege (1985), and the assassination of the presidential candidate Luis Carlos Galán (1989). The book was translated to fifteen languages and made into a movie in 2018.

Vallejo currently resides in Miami, Florida. In 2019, she returned to her work as a television journalist for the international channel Actualidad RT.

Early life

Family and childhood
Virginia Vallejo was born on 26 August 1949 in Cartago, Valle del Cauca, Colombia, near her family's ranch. Her parents were Juan Vallejo Jaramillo, an entrepreneur, and Mary García Rivera. Her paternal grandmother, Sofía Jaramillo Arango, was a descendant of Alonso Jaramillo de Andrade Céspedes y Guzmán, a nobleman from Extremadura, Spain. Several members of her family were ministers, writers and ambassadors, such as her paternal grandfather Eduardo Vallejo Varela, minister of economy (1930); her great uncle Alejandro Vallejo Varela, writer and close friend of Jorge Eliécer Gaitán; and his great-uncle Jaime Jaramillo Arango, minister of education (1934), ambassador to several countries in Europe, and co-founder of the Anglo Colombian School.

In 1950, the young family returned to Bogotá, where her siblings, Felipe (1951), Antonio (1955–2012), and Sofía (1957) were born. She studied first in the kindergarten of Elvira Lleras Restrepo, sister of President Carlos Lleras Restrepo, a friend of her family. She then attended the Anglo Colombian School.

Early career and marriages
In 1967 and 1968, she worked as an English teacher in the Centro Colombo Americano in Bogotá and, in 1969, in the presidency of Banco del Comercio. The same year, she married Fernando Borrero Caicedo, CEO of Borrero, Zamorano and Giovanelli, but they were divorced in 1971. In 1972, while she was working as director of public relations of Cervecería Andina, she received an invitation to join an upcoming television program directed by Carlos Lemos Simmonds and Aníbal Fernández de Soto.

In 1978, she married David Stivel, the Argentinian television, theater and film director, and head of the Clan Stivel. The marriage ended in 1981.

Career in the media

Introduction
Until 1998, there were only three television channels in Colombia that belonged to the Government: two commercial and one official. Inravisión, the official broadcasting entity, leased spaces to independent television producers known as  programadoras, many owned by prominent journalists or presidential families. This was the reason why Vallejo could work simultaneously as a news anchor and presenter of other programs.

1970s
From 1972 to 1975, she was as the presenter of "¡Oiga Colombia, Revista del Sábado!", a program directed by Carlos Lemos Simmonds and Fernández de Soto. From 1973 to 1975, she was the host of the television musical shows "Éxitos 73", "Éxitos 74" and "Éxitos 75", produced by THOY, the programadora of the family of President Julio César Turbay.

In 1973, she began working as a reporter on TV Sucesos-A3, the newscast directed by Alberto Acosta; and, from 1975 to 1977, she became the international editor. In the early and mid seventies, she hosted other television programs, like the quiz show TV Crucigrama, a cooking show with chef Segundo Cabezas, and a program for children.
 
In January 1978, she became the anchorwoman of Noticiero 24 Horas, which aired at 7:00 PM, and was directed by Mauricio Gómez, Ernesto Rodríguez Medina and Sergio Arboleda. In March, the Government of Taiwan invited her to the inauguration of President Chiang Ching-kuo. The same year, she was elected as the vice-president of the board of directors of the ACL, Asociación Colombiana de Locutores (Association of Colombian Speakers). In 1978, 1979 and 1980, she won the award as the Best Television Anchor of the APE, Asociación de Periodistas del Espectáculo (Association of Entertainment Journalists).

In 1979, she co-starred in the movie Colombia Connection by Gustavo Nieto Roa. In November, she appeared in Town & Country, opening the section The Beautiful Women of El Dorado. In 1979 and 1980, she presented ¡Cuidado con las Mujeres!, a program by RTI Producciones, directed by David Stivel.

1980s
In 1981, she founded her own programadora, TV Impacto, with the journalist Margot Ricci. That same year, the Government of Israel invited them to do a special program about The Holy Land.

In 1980 and 1982, she worked at Caracol Radio. She was the only journalist sent by a Colombian media outlet to London to cover the wedding of the Prince of Wales and Lady Diana Spencer on 29 July 1981. Vallejo's broadcast for Caracol lasted three hours. She covered the Miss Colombia pageant for the same station until 1985.

Between 1981 and 1983, she directed her program ¡Al Ataque! She was the first television journalist to interview Pablo Escobar in January 1983. The interview was filmed at the garbage dump of Medellín. During the interview Pablo Escobar described the charity project Medellín Sin Tugurios (Medellin without slums) launched by Escobar and his partners. The interview propelled Escobar on to the national stage.

In 1983 and 1984, she presented Hoy por Hoy, Magazín del Lunes (Magazine Today, Monday) at 7 pm. In 1984, she made a television commercial for Medias Di Lido (pantyhose), in Venice, Italy, followed by another three in Rio de Janeiro, San Juan and Cartagena. In 1983 and 1984, she presented the musical El Show de las Estrellas, directed by Jorge Barón. In 1984, she became the international editor of the Grupo Radial Colombiano (a network founded by the Cali Cartel), directed by Carlos Lemos Simmonds. In 1985, she became the anchorwoman of the newscast Telediario, directed by Arturo Abella.

In 1985, she appeared on the covers of Harper's Bazaar and Cosmopolitan. Also, in Elenco, a magazine of El Tiempo that presented her as "the symbol of an era". 
In 1988, she won a scholarship from the German Government, and she studied economic journalism in Berlin at the Internationales Institut für Journalismus.

1990s
In 1991, she returned to Colombia to co-star in the soap opera Sombra de tu Sombra of Caracol Televisión. In 1992, she presented ¡Indiscretísimo!, directed by Manuel Prado. From 1992 to 1994, she worked at Todelar radio. In October 1994, she ended her career in the Colombian media to open the South American operation of a multilevel company based in the United States.

2000s
Between 2009 and 2010, she worked as a columnist for the Venezuelan newspaper 6to Poder, directed by the opposition journalist Leocenis García; but, President Hugo Chávez closed the newspaper and jailed the director.

2019
In 2019, Vallejo returned to her work as a television journalist for the international channel RT en Español or Actualidad RT. The twelve episodes, titled as "Sueños y Pesadillas" – "Dreams and Nightmares" in English – were inspired by the "American dream", and describe problems like the huge gap between wealth and poverty, violence and guns, LGBTQ and discrimination of gender, and the high cost of healthcare, among others.

Exile and asylum in the U.S.

Departure from Colombia 
In early July 2006, Vallejo offered her testimony in the case against Alberto Santofimio, a former Justice Minister and associate of Pablo Escobar, head of the Medellín cartel and her lover from 1983 to 1987. The politician was on trial for conspiracy in the assassination of Luis Carlos Galán, a presidential candidate killed by Pablo Escobar on 18 August 1989. The following week, the Prosecutor Edgardo José Maya Villazón closed the case "for lack of evidence". All of Escobar's hitmen in the crime and several key witnesses against Santofimio had been killed, so Vallejo contacted the American Embassy in Bogotá and asked the US Government to help save her life in exchange for information on the associates of Pablo Escobar and brothers Gilberto and Miguel Rodriguez Orejuela of the Cali cartel, Pablo Escobar's nemesis. The brothers had been extradited by President Álvaro Uribe, and the trial was due to begin in Miami in a few weeks.

Vallejo's flight made news worldwide, and a home video that Vallejo had taped before her departure to protect her life was aired by Canal RCN of Colombia; according to the channel, it was watched by 14 million people, with higher rates of audience than the Football World Cup final of 2006 on 9 July. Six weeks later, Miguel and Gilberto Rodriguez Orejuela pleaded guilty; they were sentenced to 30 years in prison, and the United States Department of Justice collected $2.1 billion ($ billion today) in assets without going to trial.

Loving Pablo, Hating Escobar 
In 2007, Vallejo published Amando a Pablo, odiando a Escobar (In English: Loving Pablo, Hating Escobar), in which she describes, among other topics, her romantic relationship with Pablo Escobar, head of the Medellín Cartel, from 1982 to 1987; the origins of the rebel organizations in Colombia; the reasons for the explosive growth of the cocaine industry; the birth of MAS (Muerte a Secuestradores), which in English means 'Death to Kidnappers', The Extraditables, and the United Self-Defense Forces of Colombia; the links among the Medellin and Cali cartels, Caribbean dictators, and the Colombian presidents Alfonso López Michelsen, Ernesto Samper, and Álvaro Uribe; the siege of the Palace of Justice in 1985; Escobar's relationship with the extreme left and extreme right rebel groups; the horrors during the era of narcoterrorism from 1988 to 1993; and the hunt for and death of her former lover on 2 December 1993. Vallejo's memoir became the number one bestselling Spanish-language book in both Colombia and the United States.

Political asylum 

Upon arriving to the United States in 2006, Vallejo requested political asylum. She knew that if
returned to Colombia, she would be killed, like several witnesses in the cases vs. Alberto
Santofimio and the bosses of the Cali cartel. To grant her political asylum, the State of Department
and the Immigration Court of Miami examined Vallejo's life and could not find any investigation
against her; only hundreds of threats from members of the Colombian government, media outlets owned or directed by the family of vice president Francisco Santos Calderón and defense minister Juan Manuel Santos, and the paramilitary squads Águilas Negras (The Black Eagles).

On 3 May 2010, the United States of America granted Virginia Vallejo political asylum under the United Nations Convention against Torture. She received it due to her political opinion about powerful politicians, her testimony in high-profile criminal cases, a brutal car crash she had suffered on her way to testify in the Colombian Miami consulate, and thousands of threats against her life and integrity posted under her name in the Internet. Though most of them were withdrawn from the search engines in the following two weeks, they remain in Vallejo's case in the Miami immigration court.

Testimonies

Siege of the Palace of Justice 
In July 2008, the Colombian Government ordered Virginia Vallejo to testify in the reopened case of the Palace of Justice siege ( 6 and 7 November 1985), a massacre that cost the lives of more than 100 people, including 11 Supreme Court Justices, rebels of the M-19, government agents, and dozens of unarmed civilians. In the Colombian Consulate in Miami, a prosecutor sent by the Colombian Attorney General asked the author to confirm the events described in her memoir, in the chapter "That Palace in Flames" (Aquel Palacio en Llamas). So, during the next five hours, she explained the roles of all the actors involved in the tragedy: "Though the M-19 and the Medellín cartel were responsible for the siege, the military were responsible for the massacre". The journalist signaled also the lack of action of President Belisario Betancur: "The rebel commanders of the M-19 took the Justices as hostages, to force the government to listen to their claims, including the elimination of the extradition treaty with the United States. But, President Betancur refused to take the calls of the President of the Supreme Court, Magistrate Alfonso Reyes Echandia, pleading to save their lives, and instead he allowed the army and the police to bomb a building with 400 people inside". In her testimony under oath, she described what Pablo Escobar had told her the following year, after 10 months of separation: "The people detained after the fire, many with third degree burns, were sent to military garrisons where they were tortured – and the women gang-raped – to find the hiding places of other rebel commanders, and the money that I had paid them to steal my files before the Court ruled on our extradition; later, they were killed and disappeared in cans of quicklime and sulfuric acid." At the end of that chapter, Virginia Vallejo summarized the tragic events: "That conflagration was the holocaust of the Colombian justice system, with the triumph of the establishment, the traditional parties, and "Los Extraditables" with Escobar at the head".

Case of Luis Carlos Galán 
In July 2009, Vallejo testified in the reopened case of the assassination of presidential candidate Luis Carlos Galán which occurred on 18 August 1989, and signaled Alberto Santofimio as the main instigator of the candidate's assassination.
She described how, in 1984 and 1985 and in her presence, Alberto Santofimio had repeatedly asked Pablo Escobar to "...eliminate Senator Galan before he could become the president and extradite him".

Verdicts 
Twenty-five years after the Palace of Justice massacre, on 9 June 2010 judge Maria Stella Jara sentenced Colonel Alfonso Plazas of the army to 30 years in prison for forced disappearance of the detained. President Uribe attacked the verdict on television and offered his protection to the military. The next week, with a European human rights organization, Judge Jara had to flee Colombia and went into exile.

After 18 years of delays and appeals, in 2007 Alberto Santofimio received a sentence of 24 years in prison for conspiracy with Pablo Escobar in the assassination of Luis Carlos Galán.

Portrayals 
The romantic relationship between Virginia Vallejo and Pablo Escobar has inspired soap operas, serials, and movies, aired coast to coast in the United States and seen in many countries. All of them were fictional, and produced by two Colombian television channels owned by billionaires that Vallejo had mentioned in the memoir Loving Pablo, Hating Escobar; or co-produced with a cousin of President Juan Manuel Santos that Vallejo had accused of corruption in her book, columns and interviews. To sensationalize the character Escobar, the scriptwriters fictionalized many historical events, ignored presidential corruption, and made derogatory assumptions.

Television
The first was in El Capo (2009) of Canal RCN of Colombia, owned by the family of Carlos Ardila Lülle. It was coproduced by Fox Telecolombia, and aired in the United States by UniMas, in 2010. The Colombian actress Marcela Mar plays the role of a middle-class reporter in love with a narco.

The second was in Escobar, The Drug Lord (2012) of Caracol Televisión, owned by the family of Julio Mario Santo Domingo. The Colombian actress Angie Cepeda plays the role Regina Parejo, a naïve and elementary television presenter.

The third was in the serial Narcos (2015) of Netflix and Gaumont, co-produced with Dynamo of Colombia, directed by a cousin of President Juan Manuel Santos-Calderón that met the scriptwriters in the presidential palace. The Mexican actress Stephanie Sigman plays the role Valeria Velez, an unscrupulous journalist and key supporter of Escobar's political ambitions that instigates crimes and is finally killed by The Pepes.

Cinema

The fourth portrayal was in the movie Loving Pablo of Fernando León de Aranoa, where the Spanish actress Penélope Cruz played the role of Vallejo, while Javier Bardem played Escobar. It was produced by Millennium of Nevada, and sponsored by the Colombian Government.
 The film was launched during the 74th Venice International Film Festival (30 August – 9 September 2017), and the two leading actors were nominated for the Goya Awards of 2018.
 
Rotten Tomatoes gave 2.5 stars to the film. Many criticized the poor English accent of the
leading Spanish actors, and it was tagged as "frivolous" and as "the last soap opera about a
legendary criminal". Though the movie was inspired by Vallejo's bestselling book, the
director and co-producers created an entire adaptation with fictional scenes and characters, like an agent of
the DEA or an ex-husband plastic surgeon that never existed. In real life, Vallejo and Escobar met in 1982, when they were both 32 years-old, and she never met any officers of the DEA until she arrived to Miami in 2006. She was never fired to be replaced by a younger presenter, or threatened her directors or anyone. She was not living in Colombia during Escobar's bombings and kidnappings, and she never visited Escobar in La Catedral prison. 
In fact, Vallejo had ended her relationship with Escobar in 1987, never saw him again, and spent the following years in Germany.

Journalists that had worked with Vallejo in Colombia could not understand why Cruz had
changed completely the story to make such a derogatory portrayal of the author. In an interview, Bardem explained that "the
Colombian people had asked him not to glamorize Escobar"; but,
Vallejo explained that behind her defamatory portrayals were not only the accusations she had made against
members of the Colombian government and the Santos family, but also the millions of dollars that the television and movie
producers had received from the government of Juan Manuel Santos
Calderón, thanks to a cinema law that he had created in 2012 to promote Colombia as a touristic destination.

In Latin America, including Colombia, the title of the movie was changed to Escobar’s Treason, possibly to distance Leon de Aranoa's fictional narrative from Vallejo's events described in Loving Pablo, Hating Escobar.

See also 
 List of people granted political asylum

References

External links
 Virginia Vallejo Official Website
 Sueños y pesadillas con Virginia Vallejo

1949 births
Living people
People from Valle del Cauca Department
Colombian socialites
21st-century Colombian women writers
Colombian television presenters
Colombian political writers
Colombian non-fiction writers
Colombian radio journalists
Colombian television journalists
Colombian women journalists
Women memoirists
21st-century Colombian writers
Colombian women television journalists
Colombian women radio journalists
Colombian women television presenters